William Brightie Brown (October 19, 1925 – February 23, 2004) was an American football guard in the National Football League for the Washington Redskins and the Green Bay Packers.  He played college football at the University of Arkansas and was drafted in the nineteenth round of the 1951 NFL Draft.

1925 births
2004 deaths
American football offensive guards
Arkansas Razorbacks football players
Green Bay Packers players
People from Wynne, Arkansas
Washington Redskins players